Tim Wadlow (born July 23, 1974) is an American sailor. He competed at the 2004 Summer Olympics and the 2008 Summer Olympics.

He received the "Everett B. Morris Trophy", awarded to the ICSA College Sailor of the Year, in 1997.

References

External links
 

1974 births
Living people
American male sailors (sport)
Olympic sailors of the United States
Sailors at the 2004 Summer Olympics – 49er
Sailors at the 2008 Summer Olympics – 49er
Sportspeople from San Diego
ICSA College Sailor of the Year
Boston University Terriers sailors